Automotive molding or car body molding are decorative and protective moldings on the car body. The term applies both to the detail and the material.

Car moldings include side body molding, lower body molding, door moldings, window moldings, footrest molding, mudflaps, etc. They are often found in services in association with car mats, etc.

Various car moldings must have high scratch resistance, weather resistance and gloss matching that of the car body. A common material which provides these is polyvinyl chloride.

References

Automotive styling features